Joel McKeever (born August 7, 1967) is a figure skater who competed in pairs.  With partner Katie Wood, he finished fourth at the United States Figure Skating Championships in 1993.  After briefly skating with Tristen Vega, he later teamed with Elaine Asanakis and represented Greece.  They competed in the World Figure Skating Championships in 1996 and 1997, finishing 17th in the latter year.

References

American male pair skaters
1966 births
Living people
Greek male pair skaters